Microbiology Outreach Prize is awarded annually by the Microbiology Society to those who made outstanding innovation in outreach about microbiology.

It was introduced in 2009 and is awarded to individuals or teams. All members can nominate anyone they consider appropriate for this award.

The award consists of £500 and an invitation to give a demonstration or talk at the society's Annual Society Showcase in September.

The following have been awarded this Prize:

2009 Jo Heaton
2010 Gemma Walton
2011 Nicola Stanley-Wall
2012 Marieke Hoeve
2013 James Redfern and Helen Brown
2014 Joana Alves Moscoso
2015 Adam Roberts
2016 Laura Piddock
2017 No award made
2018 Senga Robertson-Albertyn
2019 Matt Hutchings
2020 Sreyashi Basu and Sanjib Bhakta for Project Joi Hok! a community tuberculosis awareness programme in the UK
2021 Edward Hutchinson
2022 Kalai Mathee and Jonathan Tyrrell

References

Microbiology
Biology awards